Brittany Ferries is the trading name of the French shipping company, BAI Bretagne Angleterre Irlande S.A. founded in 1973 by Alexis Gourvennec, that operates a fleet of ferries and cruiseferries between France and the United Kingdom, Ireland, and Spain, and between Spain and Ireland and the United Kingdom.

History
BAI (Bretagne Angleterre Irlande) S.A. was founded by Alexis Gourvennec. Working with fellow Breton farmers, Gourvennec lobbied for improvements to Brittany's infrastructure, including better roads, telephone network, education and port access. By 1972 he had successfully secured funding and work to develop a deep-water port at Roscoff. Gourvennec had no desire to run a ferry service, but existing operators showed little appetite for the opportunity.

The company itself began sailings on 2 January 1973 between Roscoff in Brittany and Plymouth in the South West of England, using the freight ferry Kerisnel, a former Israeli tank carrier. The company's primary aim at that time was to exploit opportunities presented by the UK's entry into the European Common Market, forerunner to the European Union, in order to export directly to markets in the United Kingdom.

In 1974, Kerisnel was replaced by Penn-Ar-Bed, which carried both passengers and vehicles, and the BAI company adopted the name Brittany Ferries.

In late 2009, the new Poole–Santander freight-only service was deemed a success and the frequency was doubled: there would now be two services a week operated by Cotentin. In November 2009, Armorique was laid up for the rest of the winter season. Major changes were announced in December 2009. Barfleur was withdrawn from service at the end of January 2010 after nearly 18 years service on the Poole–Cherbourg route. The service was temporarily served by Armorique, which came back to service earlier than originally planned. The Poole–Santander service reverted to one sailing a week with Cotentin covering freight on the Poole–Cherbourg service in the absence of Barfleur. Condor Vitesse continued to operate one round sailing a day in the summer months between the two ports. Cap Finistère ran between Portsmouth and Santander twice a week and also operated three round trips a week between Portsmouth and Cherbourg. In September 2010, Brittany Ferries announced plans to serve the Portsmouth–Bilbao route recently abandoned by P&O Ferries. The route started on 27 March 2011.

On 21 September 2012, Brittany Ferries cancelled sailings indefinitely following two days of wildcat strikes caused by crew members who were unhappy with changes in working terms and conditions. Meetings took place between management and unions to negotiate the management proposals. A vote was taken on 30 September by union members to decide if the management proposals would be accepted. The crew members accepted the proposal and services resumed on 2 October after 12 days without services. During this period, Brittany Ferries made special arrangements with P&O Ferries and MyFerryLink to accept tickets on the Dover–Calais route. Unused tickets were refunded. Services were not affected on the Poole–Cherbourg route which was being operated by Condor Ferries.

In 2018, Brittany Ferries commenced service between Cork, Ireland, and Santander. This was cancelled and effectively replaced in February 2020 by the Rosslare–Bilbao service which runs twice weekly. A seasonal service between Rosslare and Roscoff is also offered.

From late March 2020, due to the ongoing COVID-19 pandemic, Brittany Ferries was forced to cancel all passenger sailings until 15 May 2020 after British government advice was issued against all travel. Initially they had been offering refund vouchers valid for 2 years for affected customers. Many customers were unsatisfied with vouchers and had requested a refund. Brittany Ferries had begun to issue refunds in the last week of April for customers that wished for a refund. Customers were entitled to a refund under EU regulation 1177/2010.

On 23 July 2020, Brittany Ferries announced the launch of a brand new Rosslare–Cherbourg service. 

On 19 August 2020, as a consequence of the ongoing Covid-19 crisis, the company confirmed that it was reducing ferry services from the end of August and laying up various ships, beginning with Armorique and Bretagne. Further schedule changes are likely in the months ahead, the company confirmed in March 2021. It also confirmed the launch of a five-year recover plan following the loss of more than half of its revenue, the consequence of restrictions on passenger traffic in all markets in which it operates. 

On 20 July 2021, Brittany Ferries announced at a press conference in Paris that it had secured a charter with Stena RoRo for 2 more E-Flexers. The new vessels are due to replace the MV Normandie on the Portsmouth–Caen route and MV Bretagne on the Portsmouth–St Malo Route. The charter is expected to run for 10 years with the option to purchase after 4 years.

Fleet

Current

Future Fleet

Past Fleet

Routes

References

Notes

Bibliography

External links

 Official Brittany Ferries Website

Ferry companies of France
Companies based in Brittany
Ferry companies of England
Ferry companies of the Republic of Ireland
Ferry companies of Spain
Transport in Brittany
Connections across the English Channel
Transport companies established in 1972
1972 establishments in France